Ronglan Station is a railway station located in the village of Ronglan in the municipality of Levanger in Trøndelag county, Norway.  It is located on the Nordland Line. The station is served irregularly by the Trøndelag Commuter Rail service to Steinkjer and Trondheim, with several services not stopping at Ronglan.  The service is operated by SJ Norge.

History
The station was opened on 29 October 1902 on the Hell–Sunnan Line between Hell Station and Levanger Station as the section to Levanger was finished.  It is located near the intersection of the highway from Rongland to Ekne, near European route E6. The station was designed by Paul Due and was built with a surrounding park.

References

Railway stations in Levanger
Railway stations on the Nordland Line
Railway stations opened in 1902
1902 establishments in Norway
National Romantic architecture in Norway
Art Nouveau railway stations